CNEOS 2014-01-08 is an interstellar object reported in June 2019 by astronomers Amir Siraj and Abraham Loeb, and confirmed by the United States Space Command in April 2022. The discovery was publicized in 2019 in a preprint announcing a  meteor detected on 8 January 2014 near the northeast coast of Papua New Guinea.

Discovery and confirmation 
According to the researchers, the meteor originated from an unbound hyperbolic orbit with a confidence of 99.999%. The interstellar candidate was found in data from the Center for Near-Earth Object Studies. A 2019 study by Jorge I. Zuluaga published as a research note by the American Astronomical Society concluded that even if the direction were completely unknown, the probability that CNEOS 2014-01-08 was hyperbolic would still be 48%.

Confirmation was originally stymied by the problem that crucial information quantifying the accuracy of the U.S. government's data is not publicly available. However, in 2022, the United States Space Command divulged that data on the meteor velocity is "sufficiently accurate to indicate an interstellar trajectory".

Search for fragments

Amir Siraj, one of the astronomers who reported the finding of the purported interstellar meteorite, noted "We are currently investigating whether a mission to the bottom of the Pacific Ocean off the coast of Manus Island, in the hopes of finding fragments of the 2014 meteor, could be fruitful or even possible." Later, in a preprint (as well as in interviews) they described the expedition plan by The Galileo Project to retrieve small fragments of the meteor, which according to Loeb, "appears to be rare both in composition and in speed" and is not ruled out to be "extraterrestrial equipment", using a magnetic sled on the seafloor of the impact region deployed using a long line winch. Siraj noted that "The alternative way to study an interstellar object at close range is by launching a space mission to a future object passing through the Earth's neighborhood" which is thought to be much more expensive than the project's planned budget of $1.6 million. In the study, the astronomers write:

Interestingly, CNEOS 2014-01-08, with a ram pressure of 194 MPa at peak brightness, has the highest material strength of all 273 bolides. The second highest tensile strength is smaller by more than a factor of 2, namely 81 MPa for the 2017-12-15 13:14:37 bolide. The third highest tensile strength, 75 MPa, belongs to the 2017-03-09 04:16:37 bolide, which we identified as a possible interstellar meteor candidate (Siraj & Loeb 2019c). Of course, this result does not imply that the first interstellar meteor was artificially made by a technological civilization and not natural in origin (Loeb 2021). Iron meteorites make about a twentieth of all space rocks arriving on Earth.In a September 2022 blog post Loeb announced The Galileo Project expedition to search for fragments has been fully funded.

In November 2022, a paper was published, claiming the anomalous properties (including its high strength and strongly hyperbolic trajectory) of CNEOS-2014-01-08 are better described as measurement error rather than genuine parameters. If true, successful retrival of any meteoroid fragments is highly unlikely.

See also 
ʻOumuamua

References

External links
 Meteoritical Society
 Earth Impact Database 
 Every Recorded Meteorite Impact on Earth from Tableau Software

Interstellar objects
Stellar astronomy